Blauburger is a red wine grape variety that is grown a little in Austria, Czech Republic and Hungary. It should not be confused with Blauburgunder, which is an Austrian synonym for Pinot noir.

History
Blauburger is a cross between Blauer Portugieser and Blaufränkisch. It was created in 1923 by Dr. Fritz Zweigelt at the Federal Institute for Viticulture and Pomology at Klosterneuburg, Austria.

Distribution and wines
In 1999 there were 883.95 ha of Blauburger grown in Austria. It is also a permitted variety for Egri Bikavér (Bull's Blood) in Hungary. It gives wines of intense color, and some berry fruit on the palate, but with not much bouquet or tannin. It is mostly used for blending.

Vine and Viticulture
Blauburger gives good yields and is particularly resistant to Botrytis cinerea, but is susceptible to mildew.

References

See also
Zweigelt

Red wine grape varieties